Carlos Moyá was the defending champion, but was eliminated in the round robin competition.

Juan Mónaco won the title, defeating Alessio di Mauro 6–1, 6–2 in the final.

Seeds

 David Nalbandian (round robin)
 Juan Carlos Ferrero (round robin)
 Agustín Calleri (round robin, withdrew due to a back fibrosis)
 Nicolás Almagro (semifinals)
 Carlos Moyá (round robin)
 Gastón Gaudio (round robin, withdrew because of personal reasons)
 Juan Ignacio Chela (quarterfinals)
 José Acasuso (round robin, retired due to a right elbow injury)

Draw

Finals

Round robin

Due to Gaudio's withdrawal from the tournament, di Mauro advanced to Quarterfinals based on head-to-head results against Ramírez Hidalgo.

Due to Lapentti's withdrawal from the tournament, Devilder advanced to Quarterfinals based on head-to-head results against Ferrero.

Elimination round
Prior to the round robin and after the completion of the qualifying draws, the 16 players with the lowest tier in the tournament (4 qualifiers, 3 wild cards, 1 lucky loser, 2 special exempts and 6 based on ATP rankings) competed in the elimination round in order to get one of the 8 last spots into the round robin competition. Winners in this round entered as main entrants.

RR-LL: Berlocq, Vaněk and Dlouhý entered the round robin competition as lucky losers.

Qualifying

Seeds

 Óscar Hernández (first round, retired)
 Olivier Patience (first round)
 Stefano Galvani (qualifying competition, lucky loser)
 Carlos Berlocq (qualified)
 Gorka Fraile (qualifying competition)
 Boris Pašanski (first round)
 Denis Gremelmayr (qualified)
 Paolo Lorenzi (first round)

Qualifiers

Lucky loser
  Stefano Galvani

Qualifying draw

First qualifier

Second qualifier

Third qualifier

Fourth qualifier

References

External links
 Main draw
 Qualifying draw

Singles
2007 ATP Tour
ATP Buenos Aires